Daniel David Norris (born April 25, 1993) is an American professional baseball pitcher who is a free agent. He has played in Major League Baseball (MLB) for the Toronto Blue Jays, Detroit Tigers, Milwaukee Brewers and Chicago Cubs.

Minor league career

2011–2012
The Blue Jays drafted Norris in the second round (74th overall) of the 2011 MLB Draft. Baseball America rated Norris as the 91st best prospect in baseball prior to the 2012 season. He was ranked as the number 4 prospect in the Blue Jays minor league organization on July 26, 2013, when the revised Top 100 Prospects list was released.

Norris began his career with the Rookie-Advanced Bluefield Blue Jays and Low-A Vancouver Canadians in 2012, where he pitched to a combined 2–4 record, an earned run average (ERA) of 8.44, and a 1.78 walks plus hits per inning pitched (WHIP) ratio.

2013–2014
In 2013, Norris split time with the Class-A Lansing Lugnuts and High-A Dunedin Blue Jays, and finished the season with a 2–7 record, but made a major improvement with his ERA, which dropped to 3.97.

Norris began the 2014 season in Dunedin, and earned a 3–0 record with an ERA of 0.80 through his first 9 starts. On June 3, 2014, he was announced as the Pipeline Pitching Prospect of the Month of May. He posted a 1–0 record and a 0.68 ERA over 5 starts to win the award. On June 15, he was called up to the Double-A New Hampshire Fisher Cats after posting a 6–0 record, 1.22 ERA, and 1.025 WHIP in 13 starts with Dunedin. Norris appeared in the 2014 All-Star Futures Game on June 24, 2014.

As of the 2014 midseason update, he was considered the Blue Jays' top prospect, and 25th overall prospect in baseball by Baseball America.  With New Hampshire, Norris had a 3–1 win–loss record, 4.54 ERA, and struck out 49 in 35 innings before he was promoted to the Triple-A Buffalo Bisons on August 7. Making his Triple-A debut pitching in the first game of a double-header on August 10, Norris earned the win, pitching six innings against the Durham Bulls and gave up only two hits while striking out 10, including Wil Myers, on a rehabilitation assignment for the Tampa Bay Rays.  In his following start, he struck out a career-high 13 over 5 innings, making him the first pitcher in Bisons history to have back-to-back starts with at least 10 strikeouts. Norris pitched five innings and earned his third win in three tries on August 21, against the Scranton/Wilkes-Barre RailRiders. He struck out nine, walked three, and gave up one hit, a home run.  While speculation circulated that the Blue Jays intended to move Norris to the bullpen following his third Triple-A start, they instead announced on August 22 that he would continue in a starter's role. In total for 2014, he posted a 12–2 record with a 2.53 ERA and 163 strikeouts over 124 innings.  On September 3, Baseball America named him to their First Team All-Stars for 2014.  He was named to the MLB All-Prospect Team on September 26.

Major league career

Toronto Blue Jays (2014–2015)

On September 1, 2014, Norris was called up to the Blue Jays as part of the September roster expansion. On September 5, he made his MLB debut against the Boston Red Sox, striking out David Ortiz. Blue Jays manager John Gibbons announced on September 23 that Norris would make his first major league start on September 25, and would pitch 2–3 innings. Norris pitched 3 innings and yielded 2 earned runs on 1 hit, 2 walks, while striking out 1. In total for 2014, Norris pitched 6 innings with the Blue Jays, and post a 5.40 ERA, 4 strikeouts, and a 1.50 WHIP.

Norris had arthroscopic surgery on October 7, 2014, to remove bone spurs and loose bodies from his left (pitching) elbow.

On January 21, 2015, Norris was named by MLB as the third-best LHP prospect in baseball. In 2015, MLB named Norris as the number 1 Blue Jays' prospect, the number 3 left-handed pitching prospect in baseball, and the 17th best prospect overall. He opened the 2015 season in the starting rotation for the Blue Jays. After his fifth start, Norris was optioned to Triple-A Buffalo on May 1.

Detroit Tigers

2015
On July 30, 2015, Norris was traded to the Detroit Tigers along with Matt Boyd and Jairo Labourt in exchange for David Price. In his debut for the Tigers on August 2, Norris pitched 7 innings and struck out five Baltimore Orioles hitters, allowing one walk, four hits, and just one earned run on a solo home run by Chris Davis in the fourth inning. Following the home run to Davis, Norris retired the next 12 batters in a row, earning the win in a 6–1 Tigers victory.

On August 19, 2015, Norris became the first Tigers pitcher to hit a home run in his first career plate appearance, the first pitcher to do so since Tommy Milone in 2011, and the first American League pitcher to do so since Esteban Yan in 2000. He also became the first Tigers pitcher to homer since Jason Johnson did so on June 8, 2005, and the first American League pitcher to ever hit a regular-season home run at Wrigley Field. Norris exited the game in the fifth inning with a right oblique strain, and was placed on the disabled list the following day.

Norris was recalled from the disabled list on September 16. In his second start after returning from the injury, he threw five perfect innings in a September 22 game against the Chicago White Sox, but was pulled from the game after reaching a predetermined pitch count. The Tigers eventually lost the bid for a combined no-hitter with one out in the ninth inning when Neftali Feliz, the fifth pitcher used, surrendered a triple to Tyler Saladino.

Norris finished the 2015 season (combined stats between Toronto and Detroit) with a 3-2 record in 13 starts, while compiling a 3.75 ERA and 45 strikeouts in 60 innings.

2016
On March 24, 2016, the Tigers announced that Norris would start the 2016 season on the disabled list, due to a lower back issue suffered during spring training. He was recalled to the Tigers on May 11, 2016, but made only a one-inning appearance against the Baltimore Orioles on May 12 before being returned to AAA Toledo. Norris was recalled again on June 21 following the demotion of Matt Boyd, and made his first start of the 2016 season on June 23. After pitching two innings plus one batter in a July 4 start against the Cleveland Indians, Norris was removed from the game. He was later diagnosed with an oblique strain, the same injury he suffered in late 2015, and was placed on the disabled list for the third time in his career. Norris returned to the mound for the Tigers on August 9 to start a game against the Seattle Mariners. In a September 12 game against the Minnesota Twins, Norris struck out a career-high 11 batters in just  innings. Norris made 13 starts for the Tigers in 2016, finishing the season with a 4–2 record and a 3.38 ERA, while striking out 71 batters in  innings.

2017
Although he logged the most innings of his young career, Norris took a step backward in 2017, posting a 5–8 record and a 5.31 ERA while striking out 86 batters. Norris dealt with hip and quadriceps issues during the season, and admitted he dug a "deeper hole" by trying to come back too soon from a DL stint.

2018
Norris started the season in the bullpen as a long reliever. He made a spot start on April 29 but came out of the game in the third inning with groin tightness, which he has been dealing with since 2017. He was placed on the 10-day disabled list the next day which marked the fourth straight season on the DL since the Tigers acquired him. It was announced a day later that the injury would require surgery and Norris will miss 8 to 12 weeks. He was moved to the 60-day disabled list on May 8. Norris returned from the disabled list on September 1, but came out of the game in the fifth inning with a left leg injury right after giving up a 2-run home run which earned him the loss. The home run was the only hit he gave up that game. During the 2018 season, Norris failed to earn a win in eight starts and three relief appearances, going 0–5 with a 5.68 ERA.

2019
On January 11, 2019, the Tigers avoided arbitration with Norris, agreeing on a one-year, $1.275 million contract. Norris ended the season with a 3-13 record despite setting career highs in games (32), starts (29), innings and strikeouts (125). In the latter part of the season, the Tigers limited Norris to three innings per start in an effort to manage his workload.

2020
On January 10, 2020, the Tigers avoided arbitration with Norris, agreeing on a one-year contract worth $2,962,500. On July 9, 2020, it was announced that Norris had tested positive for COVID-19. Norris was later cleared to join the Opening Day roster. In 14 games during the 2020 season, Norris went 3–1 with a 3.25 ERA and 28 strikeouts in  innings.

2021
On January 15, 2021, the Tigers and Norris agreed on a one-year, $3.475 million contract, avoiding arbitration. On March 26, Tigers manager A. J. Hinch announced that Norris would start the 2021 season in the bullpen. In 38 games for the 2021 Tigers, Norris was 1–3 with a 5.89 ERA and 40 strikeouts in  innings.

Milwaukee Brewers
On July 30, 2021, Norris was traded to the Milwaukee Brewers in exchange for minor league prospect Reese Olson. Norris appeared in 18 games for the 2021 Brewers, all in relief, compiling a 6.64 ERA in  innings.

Chicago Cubs
On March 19, 2022, Norris officially agreed to a one-year contract with the Chicago Cubs. He was designated for assignment on July 17, 2022. He was released on July 23.

Detroit Tigers (second stint)
On July 26, 2022, Norris signed a minor league contract with the Detroit Tigers. He was assigned to the Triple-A Toledo Mud Hens. Norris was called up from Toledo on August 11. He recorded 2 wins pitching in 14 games and became a free agent at the end of the season.

Cincinnati Reds
On February 15, 2023, Norris signed a minor league contract with the Cincinnati Reds organization. Norris allowed five earned runs in  innings pitched across seven appearances in spring training, and was released by the Reds on March 20.

International career
On October 29, 2018, he was selected MLB All-Stars at 2018 MLB Japan All-Star Series

Pitching style
He learned all of the pitches by his senior year of high school. In 2012, he overhauled his pitching mechanics to improve the repetitiveness of his delivery.

Personal life
Norris is a Christian. Norris has said, “I know God has a plan no matter what. No longer do I live and die by my success. I live and die by my faith in God. Everything after that is just an added blessing.”

Norris's family has owned a bicycle shop in Johnson City, Tennessee, for more than 80 years. In the offseason, Norris lives by choice in a 1978 Volkswagen Westfalia van, nicknamed "Shaggy.” His unconventional lifestyle can be described as nonconformist and minimalist, and has raised eyebrows in MLB. Prior to the 2015 season, Tony LaCava, Toronto's assistant general manager, said of Norris "He takes care of himself as well as anybody we've got. He's in great shape. He competes on the mound. If that wasn't the case, maybe we'd be more worried about some of the other stuff. But right now, the van and all that is secondary. He has great values, and they're working for him."

Despite his $2 million signing bonus, Norris lives off just $800 a month. In an interview with ESPN he was asked why he chooses to continue to live so conservatively.  He asked back, "Who am I to deserve that? What have I really done?"  He has also said, "I'm actually more comfortable being kind of poor," as it helps him maintain a minimalist lifestyle and resist conformity.

On October 19, 2015, Norris announced through his Instagram account that he had been diagnosed with thyroid cancer. He was diagnosed the previous April, and with a doctor's consent, he continued playing and delayed treatment until the end of the season. On October 29, Norris announced he was cancer free following a successful surgery to remove a malignant growth from his thyroid.

One of Norris' hobbies is photography. During the 2015 season, he acquired professional photographer Ben Moon's Canon EF 85mm portrait lens, and the two became friends. That offseason, the two went on a road trip together, from Norris' home state of Tennessee to Oregon, where Moon is based. Moon has turned footage from the trip into a short film, titled "Offseason."

See also

List of Major League Baseball players with a home run in their first major league at bat

References

External links

1993 births
Living people
American expatriate baseball players in Canada
Baseball players from Tennessee
Bluefield Blue Jays players
Buffalo Bisons (minor league) players
Chicago Cubs players
Detroit Tigers players
Dunedin Blue Jays players
Erie SeaWolves players
Lakeland Flying Tigers players
Lansing Lugnuts players
Milwaukee Brewers players
New Hampshire Fisher Cats players
People from Johnson City, Tennessee
Toledo Mud Hens players
Toronto Blue Jays players
Vancouver Canadians players